Physical is an American comedy-drama television series created by Annie Weisman that premiered on Apple TV+ on June 18, 2021.

In August 2021, the series was renewed for a second season ahead of its first season finale which premiered on June 3, 2022. In August 2022, the series was renewed for a third season.

Premise 
Set in 1980s San Diego, Physical is a dark comedy following Sheila Rubin (Rose Byrne) through her journey of self discovery via aerobics.

Cast and characters

Main cast 
 Rose Byrne as Sheila Rubin
 Rory Scovel as Danny Rubin, Sheila's husband
 Paul Sparks as John Breem, a mall owner
 Della Saba as Bunny Kazam, an aerobics instructor and Tyler's girlfriend
 Lou Taylor Pucci as Tyler, a surfer and Bunny's boyfriend
 Dierdre Friel as Greta Hauser, a housewife and Ernie's wife
 Geoffrey Arend as Jerry Goldman, an old friend of Sheila and Danny who becomes Danny's campaign manager (season 1; guest season 2)
 Ashley Liao as Simone (season 1)

Recurring cast 
 Ian Gomez as Ernie Hauser, a tech pioneer and Greta's husband
 Erin Pineda as Maria Breem, John's wife
 Grace Kelly Quigley as Maya Rubin, Sheila and Danny's daughter
 Wallace Langham as Auggie Cartwright (season 2; guest season 1)
 Murray Bartlett as Vinnie Green, an aerobics instructor (season 2)
 Anna Gunn as Marika Green, Vinnie’s wife (season 2)
 Tawny Newsome as Wanda (season 2)
 Donny Divanian as Kevin Cartwright, Auggie’s son (season 2)
 Emjay Anthony as Zeke Breem, John and Maria's son (season 2; portrayed by Ian Ousley in season 1)

Episodes

Series overview

Season 1 (2021)

Season 2 (2022)

Production

Development 
In January 2020, it was reported that Apple was nearing a series order for Physical, created and written by Annie Weisman, with Tomorrow Studios set to produce. In December 2020, Craig Gillespie, Liza Johnson, and Stephanie Laing were announced as directors for the series, with Gillespie set to direct the pilot episode. The series is a half-hour long and consists of ten episodes.
On August 4, 2021, Apple TV+ renewed the series for a second season. On August 11, 2022, Apple TV+ renewed the series for a third season.

Casting 
In January 2020, Rose Byrne was reported as headlining Physical. In December 2020, it was announced that Byrne was playing the role of Sheila Rubin, with Paul Sparks, Rory Scovel, Lou Taylor Pucci, Della Saba, Dierdre Friel, and Ashley Liao joining the cast. Geoffrey Arend joined the cast in January 2021, with Ian Gomez joining in April 2021. In October 2022, Zooey Deschanel joined the cast for the third season.

Filming 
Filming for the first season began in November 2020 and ended in March 2021. The second season began filming in November 2021 and ended in March 2022.

Release 
The series premiered on June 18, 2021, on Apple TV + globally with the first three episodes available immediately and the rest debuting on a weekly basis, every Friday. The second season premiered on June 3, 2022.

Reception
On Rotten Tomatoes, the first season holds an approval rating of 67% based on 48 critic reviews, with an average rating of 6.49/10. The website's critical consensus reads, "Not even a magnetic performance from Rose Byrne can save Physical from its exhausting parade of unpleasant characters and plot choices." On Metacritic, it has a weighted average score of 60 out of 100, based on 21 critics, indicating "mixed or average reviews". German online magazine Spiegel was delighted and pointed out the difference between American and European reception, saying "that snarky social satire pitches into body cult and consumeristic insanity to our veritable pleasure; American critics were rather appalled – without any reason."

The second season has an approval rating of 91% approval rating on Rotten Tomatoes, based on 11 critic reviews, with an average rating of 8.6/10.

References

External links 
 

Apple TV+ original programming
2021 American television series debuts
2020s American comedy-drama television series
English-language television shows
Television series set in the 1980s
Television shows set in San Diego